Johnny Guirke is an Irish Sinn Féin politician who has been a Teachta Dála (TD) for the Meath West constituency since the 2020 general election.

Political career 
Guirke was a member of Meath County Council for the Kells local electoral area from 2014 to 2020, first elected in 2014 and re-elected again in 2019. Michael Gallagher was co-opted to Guirke's seat on Meath County Council following his election to the Dáil.

In the 2020 Irish general election, Guirke was elected as a TD for Meath West, topping the poll.

In August 2022 the Irish Independent reported that Guirke failed to register one of his rental properties with the Residential Tenancies Board. He was warned by Sinn Féin that any further lapses in registration of rental properties “will result in disciplinary action from the party”.

Personal life 
Guirke moved to Boston in 1988, where he worked in the construction industry for 18 years, before moving back to Meath.

Guirke met his wife Mary while living in Boston, and the couple have four children.

References

External links
Johnny Guirke's page on the Sinn Féin website

Living people
Year of birth missing (living people)
Local councillors in County Meath
Members of the 33rd Dáil
Sinn Féin TDs (post-1923)